Atoka is a local government area with a town charter in Tipton County, Tennessee, United States. In 1888, Atoka was a stop on the Newport News & Mississippi Valley Railroad. Today the City of New Orleans Amtrak passenger train makes its daily route between New Orleans and Chicago, through Atoka. The population was 10,008 at the 2020 census, making the Town of Atoka the largest municipality in Tipton County.

Historians and genealogists can trace the Town of Atoka's origins back to the 1838 charter of Portersville. Atoka adopted Portersville's charter as its own. World War I Medal of Honor recipient Sgt. Joseph B. Adkison lived in Atoka, and he is buried nearby.

Five public parks exist within the town limits.  The town has grown significantly since the 1990 census, at which time the population was only 659.   Covington, the county seat, has the second largest population.

History

Origins
From the fiftieth anniversary of the Covington Leader, 1886 to 1936:
The trading center for the Atoka area before the rise of the town was Portersville...
With the coming of the railroad in 1872 and opening of stores in Atoka, there grew up an intense rivalry between the two towns, but Atoka's advantage of the railroad proved to be too much, and Portersville gradually died out. Today not a store or store building remains in Portersville and it passes into history... 

A peek into the life of John McLaughlin, a citizen of both towns, gives us some idea of what Portersville and Atoka were like:
Our subject received a collegiate education at Bellenyna College, Ireland and in 1852 came to America, landing at Charleston, S. C.; then immediately went to Chester, S. C., and spent three years learning the carriage-maker's trade, when he moved to Aberdeen, Miss., and established a factory of his own, and three years later moved to Portersville, Tipton County, and continued the business five years, then went into merchandising and farming, selling goods at Portersville two years, then moved to Atoka and continued the mercantile business over ten years, and since that time has given his attention exclusively to farming and running a steam cotton-gin, which he owns.

Atoka and Portersville in Tennessee, U.S.A.
June 1, 1796 - The Southwest Territory was admitted as the 16th state, Tennessee.

1911 - Atoka was reincorporated.

Railroad 
If the dates are taken into account, "the coming of the railroad in 1872" and "the name of Portersville changed to Atoka in 1875". These two locations, Portersville and Atoka, existed simultaneously. The railroad came to Atoka first. Then the town of Atoka was incorporated. Atoka was an unincorporated location long before it was a chartered town.

United States Postal Service, Rural Free Delivery in Atoka

The official stance of the United States Postal Service, according to an article published by the Historian of the United States Postal Service in April 2008, is that Atoka was the first post office with rural free delivery in Tennessee starting on January 11, 1897. But according to an article in Tipton County's local newspaper, published in 1936:
ATOKA ROUTE ONE IS THIRD IN UNITED STATES
The first rural route established in the South and the third established in the United States was set up at Atoka in 1895. At that time the United States Post Office Department was experimenting with rural routes. They established one in the North, one in the East, and one in the South at Atoka... The first route, which was Atoka Route 1, was 16½ miles long... Route 1 was later combined with route 2, which covers the territory from Atoka to the Mississippi River.

Another article from 1936 describes more about the post office:
Atoka's first postmaster was D. Bowden. With the development of the United States' splendid rural delivery system in her post office department, the Atoka post office grew in importance. Today there are two rural routes reaching out from the town, serving that section from the Mississippi river on the west to Salem on the east. All mail for Munford, Drummonds, Richardson's Landing, Randolph and other communities passes through the post office at Atoka, whose postmaster is E. M. Quisenberry and whose rural carriers are J. E. McQuiston and R. S. McDill.

Town charter

June 24, 1911 - Atoka reincorporated

1911 Charter with amendments from 2006, 1977, 1973, and 1969.

August 17, 2012 - AN ACT to amend Chapter 373, of the Private Acts of 1911.

Current Charter Information - Town of Atoka, Tennessee.

Current zip code data for Atoka, Tennessee is 38004

The zip code for Atoka, Tennessee, is 38004. The current area of the Atoka 38004 is shown in the Zip Code Data Maps.

Parks, greenway, and recreational facilities in Town of Atoka 

Atoka has five city parks: Adkison Park, Atoka Greenway Trail, Nancy Lane Park, Pioneer Park, and Walker Park. Each park has its own history and distinctive recreational facilities.

Adkison Park 
Atoka's first park, Adkison Park, was established as a project for the Tennessee Homecoming '86 celebration. It is just over an acre in size. It has a 1/8th mile asphalt lighted walking track, a playground feature shaped like a train, picnic tables, benches, and a memorial plaza area. The memorial plaza area is a memorial area dedicated to the memory of Seargent Joseph B. Adkison. The Bobby McDill Scout Hut, home base of Boy Scouts of America Troop 60 of Atoka, is located within Adkison Park.

Atoka Greenway Trail 
The Atoka Greenway Trail is a planned connection between Walker Park and Pioneer Park. "On June 25, 2013, Governor Bill Haslam announced that Atoka had received a $400,000 Transportation Alternatives grant to fund Phase I of the Atoka Greenway Trail project."

Nancy Lane Park 
Nancy Lane Park is nearly 42 acres in size. It is named in honor of long-time Atoka resident, Alderman, and dedicated park supporter Nancy Lane. It has a full size caboose, a wooded nature trail, a large playground, pavilions, picnic tables, an 18-hole disc golf course, a 4 diamond softball complex with a concession stand, and restrooms. Nancy Lane Park is the home of the Atoka Dixie Youth Softball program and served as host for the 2014 Dixie Youth Softball World Series.

Pioneer Park 
Pioneer Park is more than 6.5 acres. It has a 1/3 mile lighted walking track, a playground, picnic tables, and a fishing pond with a fountain. "A nearly 2 acre pond with fountain feature is the central focus of the park, with the walking trail ringing the pond."

Walker Park 
Walker Park is more than 60 acres. It is named in honor of long-time Mayor Charles Walker. It has restrooms, a 1.15 mile walking track, a playground, pavilions, picnic tables, concession stand, splash pad, lighted athletic field, and sand volleyball courts.

Legal planning area of Town of Atoka

In the unincorporated area to the East of the city limits, the Planning Commission, Board of Zoning Appeals, and code enforcement office of the Town of Atoka has a certain amount planning permission control over the planning area.

Transportation routes

Railroad
The Canadian National Railway is the current railroad company that owns the rails going through Atoka. This railroad runs from New Orleans, Louisiana, U.S.A., to Chicago, Illinois, U.S.A., and into Canada. The City of New Orleans, an Amtrak passenger train, still makes one trip to Illinois and another trip back to New Orleans each day, through Atoka. The previous railway owner was Illinois Central Railroad. To visitors, the railroad in Atoka may seem inactive, but the rail system is busy with regular traffic in 2019.

Highways
U.S. Route 51 passes through the western edge of the Town of Atoka, from Shelby County to the south and the town of Brighton to the north. The City of Munford meets the Town of Atoka city limits to the west and in the center of Highway 51. Highway 51 is the route south to Millington, the downtown area of Memphis. and north through Covington, Ripley, and Dyersburg.Randolph

Tennessee State Route 14 or Highway 14 or Austin Peay Highway is west of Atoka. Highway 14 goes south into the Raleigh area where Methodist North is located. It runs north to help drivers get to Brownsville.

South of Millington, or about a twenty-minute drive, is Tennessee State Route 385. Many of the areas in Shelby County can be reached from 385.

Mississippi River 

Although Atoka is only about 19 minutes away from the Mississippi River at Randolph, the closest bridge that allows a car to travel to Arkansas is almost 40 minutes away - the Hernando de Soto Bridge in Memphis. The next closest bridge is located in Dyersburg.

Geography

The town of Atoka is located at  (35.424740, -89.782652).

Atoka, Tennessee is located in Tipton County, Tennessee. The County south of Tipton County is Shelby County where the city of Memphis, Tennessee is located. Tipton County is located in the Tennessee Grand Division of West Tennessee. The map of the United States gives a view of where Tennessee is located within the contiguous United States.
 The Mississippi River defines the western border of the state of Tennessee. The Tennessee counties that have the Mississippi River as their western boundary are Shelby, Tipton, Lauderdale, Dyer, and Lake Counties. Atoka is located just east of the Mississippi River.

Demographics

2020 census

As of the 2020 United States census, there were 10,008 people, 2,942 households, and 2,395 families residing in the town.

2000 census
As of the census of 2000, there were 3,235 people, 1,075 households, and 935 families residing in the town. The population density was 485.0 people per square mile (187.3/km2). There were 1,145 housing units at an average density of 171.7 per square mile (66.3/km2). The racial makeup of the town was 87.88% White, 9.30% African American, 0.25% Native American, 0.53% Asian, 0.06% Pacific Islander, 0.31% from other races, and 1.67% from two or more races. Hispanic or Latino of any race were 2.10% of the population.

There were 1,075 households, out of which 49.2% had children under the age of 18 living with them, 75.6% were married couples living together, 7.7% had a female householder with no husband present, and 13.0% were non-families. 11.0% of all households were made up of individuals, and 2.7% had someone living alone who was 65 years of age or older. The average household size was 3.01 and the average family size was 3.24.

In the town, the population was spread out, with 31.9% under the age of 18, 6.8% from 18 to 24, 35.8% from 25 to 44, 19.8% from 45 to 64, and 5.7% who were 65 years of age or older. The median age was 32 years. For every 100 females there were 102.3 males. For every 100 females age 18 and over, there were 98.1 males.

The median income for a household in the town was $58,583, and the median income for a family was $61,643. Males had a median income of $38,721 versus $24,487 for females. The per capita income for the town was $19,644. About 3.0% of families and 4.4% of the population were below the poverty line, including 7.1% of those under age 18 and 3.7% of those age 65 or over.

Education
Atoka Public Schools are part of Tipton County Schools. The Tipton County School District has eight elementary schools, five middle schools and four high schools.  Atoka Elementary School, opened in 2008, is located in Atoka. Younger students in the Atoka area may attend any of various public schools.  Dr. John Combs is the Director of Schools.

References

External links

Official site 
Parks

Towns in Tipton County, Tennessee